The Swanson River (Dena'ina: Yaghetnu) is a stream,  long, on the Kenai Peninsula of south-central Alaska in the United States. Beginning at Gene Lake in the Swanson Lakes district, it flows southwest then north to Number Three Bay on the Gompertz Channel of Cook Inlet.

The majority of the river's course lies within the Kenai National Wildlife Refuge. In its lower reaches, it passes through the Swanson River Oil Field east of Nikiski before turning sharply north. Near its mouth, it flows through Captain Cook State Recreation Area and under Kenai North Road to enter Cook Inlet.

Recreation
Swanson River and the many lakes around it are popular places for trips in light canoes and kayaks. Two canoe trails involve lakes and streams rated Class I (easy) on the International Scale of River Difficulty. The portages, which may cross swampy ground, vary from easy to difficult. In addition to boggy terrain, hazards include wind-driven waves, mosquitoes, and a dearth of good campsites.

It is possible to float the Swanson River itself from the outlet at Gene Lake to the North Kenai Road bridge. A shorter float goes  by river from Gene Lake to Swanson River Landing near Swan Lake Road and the Rainbow Lake Campground.

The Swanson system of lakes and streams supports large populations of game fish. The main species are silver salmon, rainbow trout, and Arctic char and Dolly Varden.

See also
List of rivers of Alaska

References

External links
 Captain Cook State Recreation Area – Alaska Department of Natural Resources
 Kenai National Wildlife Refuge Campgrounds – U.S. Fish and Wildlife Service

Rivers of Kenai Peninsula Borough, Alaska
Rivers of the Kenai Peninsula
Rivers of Alaska